Dosuti (Dosutie, Dusuti, Cotton Dosuti, Dosuti cotton) was one of the coarser cotton piece goods produced in the Indian subcontinent. Originally, it was a handspun and handloom cloth made in the villages. Punjab was having various cotton qualities during the 19th century. All were distinguished with their weight, thickness, and the yarn (count and number of yarn used). Dosuti was a cloth made by running two yarns in warp and weft as its name refers to Do(double) Suti (cotton yarns). India's Eastern side was famous for more delicate cotton materials such as Dacca muslins, and Punjab and Gujarat were famous for coarser cotton textile piece goods. Dosuti was a thick cotton material used for rough usages, such as duster. The other contemporary cotton products were Eksuti (made of the single thread), Tinsuti (three threads), and Chausuti (with four threads), etc.

Ded Suti is another variant of Dosuti cotton. Ded means 1.5 consists of two threads (as one) in the warp and a single thread in the weft.

Production 
Punjab region was popular for these kind of clothes. Fabrics similar to Dosuti were also weaved in Jail Industries,  daily production was estimated 25 feet per person with 28 inches width by using 10.5 yarn count on throw shuttles.

Use 
The Dosuti cotton was used for duster, clothing for poor people, shirts, towels and bedding purposes.

Present 
The Dosuti is categorized as a handloom product of the Khadi industry and standardized with specific parameters for instance IS 179 : 2009.

See also 
 Bafta cloth
Adhotar

References 

Woven fabrics
Punjabi words and phrases